Praseodymium(III) carbonate is an inorganic compound, with a chemical formula of Pr2(CO3)3. The anhydrous form is olive green, and many of its hydrates such as heptahydrate and octahydrate are known. They are all insoluble in water.

Preparation
Praseodymium(III) carbonate can be obtained by the hydrolysis of praseodymium(III) chloroacetate:
 2 Pr(C2Cl3O2)3 + 3 H2O → Pr2(CO3)3 + 6 CHCl3 + 3 CO2
It can also be obtained by reacting sodium bicarbonate saturated with carbon dioxide with a praseodymium chloride solution.

Chemical properties
Praseodymium(III) carbonate is soluble in acids, and emits carbon dioxide:
 Pr2(CO3)3 + 6 H+ → 2 Pr3+ + 3 H2O + 3 CO2↑
However, it is insoluble in water.

Other compounds
Praseodymium(III) carbonate forms compounds with N2H4, such as Pr2(CO3)3•12N2H4•5H2O which is a pale green crystal that is slightly soluble in water but insoluble in benzene, with d20°C = 1.873 g/cm3.

References

Praseodymium compounds
Carbonates